In the Blockade of Montenegro (10 April – 14 May 1913) a multi-national naval squadron summoned by the Great Powers and under the command of Sir Cecil Burney blockaded the Montenegrin ports. The purpose of the blockade was stopping Montenegrin reinforces and supplies from reaching the Albanian coast.

History
During the First Balkan War, the Great Powers decided that the disputed region should be given to the newly independent kingdom of Albania, created as a neutral country under international administration, and they decided to carry out a blockade to reinforce this decision. As Montenegro continued their siege of Scutari, the Great Powers decided to implement the blockade, which was declared on 10 April 1913. The purpose was to prevent Serbian supplies and reinforcements from reaching the Albanian coast. The blockade, consisting of a "multi-national naval squadron", lasted from 10 April until 14 May 1913.

Among the ships involved in the blockade were the Austro-Hungarian SMS Aspern, SMS Erzherzog Franz Ferdinand, SMS Radetzky, SMS Salamander, SMS Zenta and SMS Zrínyi, the British HMS Africa, HMS Britannia, HMS Commonwealth, HMS Dominion, HMS Hibernia, HMS Hindustan, HMS King Edward VII and HMS Zealandia (3rd Battle Squadron), HMS Dublin and HMS Darmouth, the French Edgar Quinet and Ernest Renan, the German SMS Breslau, and the Italian Ammiraglio di Saint Bon and Francesco Ferruccio.

The block initially extended along the Montenegrian-Albanian coast from Bar (now in Montenegro) up to the outlet of the river Drin, near Shëngjin, in present-day Albania. On 23 April, Burney extended the block up to Durrës in Albania.

Pressured by the international blockade, Serbia withdrew its army from Scutari, which was subsequently occupied by a joint Allied ground force.

References

Battles of the First Balkan War
1913 in Albania
1913 in Montenegro
Battles involving the United Kingdom
Battles involving Austria-Hungary
Battles involving Montenegro